Marktbergel is a municipality in the district of Neustadt (Aisch)-Bad Windsheim in Bavaria in Germany.

Mayor
Manfred Kern was elected as the new mayor in March 2014, and re-elected in 2020.

References

Neustadt (Aisch)-Bad Windsheim